Also see:

2009–10 FIS Ski Jumping World Cup

2009–10 FIS Ski Jumping World Cup Individual Results Table

Key:

FIS Ski Jumping World Cup